Alin Ștefan Vigariu (born 18 September 1980) is a Romanian footballer who plays as a midfielder for IFK Mora.

References

External links
 
 

1980 births
Living people
Romanian footballers
Association football midfielders
Liga I players
Liga II players
FC U Craiova 1948 players
AFC Rocar București players
IK Brage players
FC Gloria Buzău players
CS Turnu Severin players
ACS Sticla Arieșul Turda players
Dalkurd FF players
Romanian expatriate footballers
Romanian expatriate sportspeople in Sweden
Expatriate footballers in Sweden
Sportspeople from Craiova